Båtvika  is a cove at the southern part of the island of Jan Mayen. It is located at the southeastern side of the island, in the southwestern part of Rekvedbukta, northeast of Kapp Traill. The settlement Olonkinbyen is located on the plain northeast of the cove, and Båtvika is the settlement's nearest harbour.

References

Landforms of Jan Mayen
Bodies of water of Norway
Coves of Europe